This is a list of Dutch people in the United Kingdom, who are citizens or residents of the United Kingdom of Dutch origin.

 Audrey Hepburn, actress and humanitarian
 Jane Seymour, actress
 Nick Clegg, ex-leader of the Liberal Democrats (2007–2015) and Deputy Prime Minister of the United Kingdom during the Cameron–Clegg coalition
 Douglas Booth, actor
 Carol Vorderman, media personality

See also
 Dutch people in the United Kingdom
 List of Dutch people

References

Dutch
Dutch Britons
 
United Kingdom